Van Hamel or Vanhamel is a surname. Notable people with the surname include:

A. G. van Hamel (1886–1945), Dutch academic
Mike Van Hamel (born 1989), Belgian footballer
Tim Vanhamel (born 1977), Belgian rock musician

Surnames of Dutch origin